The 1986 SANFL Grand Final was an Australian rules football competition.  beat  135 to 87.

References 

SANFL Grand Finals
SANFL Grand Final, 1986